San Ignacio Department may refer to:
 San Ignacio Department, Paraguay, now known as Misiones Department
 San Ignacio Department, Misiones, Argentina 

Department name disambiguation pages